"My Only Love" is a song written by Jimmy Fortune, and recorded by American country music group The Statler Brothers.  It was released in November 1984 as the third and final single from their album Atlanta Blue.  The song reached Number One on the Billboard Hot Country Singles chart in March 1985.

Chart performance

References

1984 singles
The Statler Brothers songs
Songs written by Jimmy Fortune
Song recordings produced by Jerry Kennedy
Mercury Records singles
1984 songs